The 2016 Pan American Qualification Tournament for Rio Olympic Games was held in Aguascalientes, Mexico from March 10 to March 11, 2016. Each country may enter maximum 2 male and 2 female divisions with only one in each division and the first two ranked athletes per weight division qualify their NOCs a place each for Olympic Games.

Medalists

Men

Women

Qualification summary

Results

Men

−58 kg
11 March

−68 kg
11 March

−80 kg
10 March

+80 kg
10 March

Women

−49 kg
10 March

−57 kg
10 March

−67 kg
11 March

+67 kg
11 March

References

1st Day Results
Complete Results

External links
 World Taekwondo Federation

Olympic Qualification
Taekwondo Olympic Qual
2016 in Mexican sports
Taekwondo qualification for the 2016 Summer Olympics